Meriwether Lewis Walker (September 30, 1869 – July 29, 1947) was an officer in the United States Army with the rank of Brigadier General, who served as a Governor of the Panama Canal Zone from 1924 to 1928.

Biography
Walker was born on September 30, 1869 in Lynchburg, Virginia as the son of Thomas Lidsay and Catherine Dabney Walker.

He attended the United States Military Academy at West Point and graduated from this institution in the summer of 1893. He was also commissioned a second lieutenant in the U.S. Army Corps of Engineers.

He served as a director of the Army Field Engineering School from 1912 to 1914. He served as chief engineer of Punitive Expeditions into Mexico from 1916 to 1917. He was chief engineer of American Expeditionary Forces from August 1918 to August 1919. He was chief maintenance engineer of the Panama Canal from 1921 to 1924. He served as Panama Canal Zone Governor from 1924 to 1928.

He died on July 29, 1947.

Decorations
Here is the ribbon bar of Brigadier General Walker:

References

1869 births
1947 deaths
Military personnel from Virginia
People from Lynchburg, Virginia
Governors of the Panama Canal Zone
United States Military Academy alumni
United States Army War College alumni
United States Army generals of World War I
United States Army generals
Recipients of the Distinguished Service Medal (US Army)
Officiers of the Légion d'honneur
Engineers from Virginia
Canal executives